Jewish magical papyri are a subclass of papyri with specific Jewish magical uses, and which shed light on popular belief during the late Second Temple Period and after in Late Antiquity. A related category of contemporary evidence are Jewish magical inscriptions, typically on amulets, ostraca, and incantation bowls.

Jewish magic
Although magic was forbidden by Levitical law in the Hebrew Bible, it was widely practised in the late Second Temple period, and particularly well documented in the period following the destruction of the temple into the 3rd, 4th, and 5th centuries C.E. Jewish and Samaritan magicians appear in the New Testament, Acts of the Apostles, and also in the works of Josephus, such as Atomos, a Jewish magician of Cyprus (Antiquities of the Jews 20:142).

Papyri texts
The language of the papyri may be:
 Aramaic, as in Bodleian Heb.d83, a small fragment intended for placement in a metal magical amulet, found in Oxyrhynchus with twelve lines with an invocation "by the eye of Shemihaza" "for a dog to bite someone".
 Greek, as a subset of the Greek Magical Papyri catalogued by Karl Preisendanz and others.
 Hebrew, as Louvre E7020, which relates to Jewish Merkaba literature and angelic liturgy.

Jewish magical papyri supplement the evidences for angelology found in early rabbinic material, for example in identifying the existence of a national angel named Israel.

The character of Jewish magical papyri is often syncretic. Some "Jewish magical papyri" may not themselves be Jewish but syncretic invocations of the Tetragrammaton by non-Jews.

Amulet and incantation bowl inscriptions
Although not technically "papyri", inscriptions on amulets and incantation bowls offer context. Jewish incantation bowls were collected most notably by Shlomo Moussaieff and the inscriptions analysed by Dan Levene (2002).

Importance for research
The discovery, primarily during the heyday of Near Eastern archaeology in the late 19th century, and subsequent interpretation and cataloguing, primarily during the early 20th century, has been followed by incorporation into academic research which has allowed Jewish magical papyri and magical inscriptions a supplemental role to major sources such as Pseudepigrapha, Apocrypha, Dead Sea Scrolls, Philo, Josephus, the New Testament, and the Talmud.

See also
Greek magical papyri
Practical Kabbalah

References

Greek-language papyri
Jewish grimoires
Practical Kabbalah
Language and mysticism